Arctocephalites is an extinct ammonitic cephalopod genus from the Middle Jurassic with a wide northern distribution belonging to the stephanoceratacean family, Cardioceratidae.

The inner whorls of the Arctocephalites shell are sharply ribbed but change abruptly to smooth. The such, as characteristic of the family, is complex with large first lateral lobe and well-developed umbilical lobe.

Arctocephalites has been found in Bathonian age sediments at Cook Inlet, Alaska, in western Montana, and in the North Sea at  paleolatitudes ranging from about 30deg N to 50deg N. It has been found in equivalent age sediments in the Volga and Pechora river basin in Russia  as well as in Greenland, FanzJoseph Land, NovayZemlya, and eastern Siberia.

References

Jurassic ammonites of North America
Bathonian life